Tatsuma Ito was the defending champion but decided to participate at the 2013 BNP Paribas Open instead.
In the final, fourth seeded John Millman outlasted second seeded Marco Chiudinelli in 2 hours and 26 minutes to claim the title with a scoreline of 4–6, 6–4, 7–6(7–2).

Seeds

Draw

Finals

Top half

Bottom half

References
 Main Draw
 Qualifying Draw

All Japan Indoor Tennis Championships - Singles
2013 Singles